Alfred Clarke (born 16 February 1831 at Nottingham; died 23 October 1878 at Ruddington, Nottinghamshire) was an English professional cricketer who played first-class cricket from 1851 to 1863.  He was mainly associated with Nottinghamshire County Cricket Club and made 55 known appearances in first-class matches.

Clarke was the son of William Clarke and he played for the All-England Eleven, founded by his father, from 1851 until his retirement.  He made 10 appearances for the North in the North v South series and was a member of the English cricket team in Australia in 1863–64 led by his Nottinghamshire colleague George Parr.  Clarke retired from cricket when the tour ended.

References

External links

Bibliography
 Arthur Haygarth, Scores & Biographies, several volumes, Lillywhite, 1862–72

1831 births
1878 deaths
English cricketers
English cricketers of 1826 to 1863
Nottinghamshire cricketers
North v South cricketers
All-England Eleven cricketers